Juan Claros Pérez de Guzmán y Fernández de Córdoba, 11th Duke of Medina Sidonia (1642–1713) became Duke of Medina Sidonia in 1667 upon the death of his half-brother Gaspar Juan Pérez de Guzmán, 10th Duke of Medina Sidonia.

In around 1670 he married Antonia Teresa Pimentel (b. 1646). She was the daughter of the 8th Duke of Benavente and already twice widowed. Her first husband Andrea Fabrizio Pigntelli d´Aragona, Prince of the Holy Roman Empire, 5th Prince of Noia and 7th Duke of Monteleone was killed in battle in 1677. Her second was Jaime Francico Víctor Fernández de Híjar, 5th Duke of Híjar. He was Mayordomo mayor to King Charles II and later Caballerizo mayor to King Philip V.

The duke also married for a second time to a Mariana Núñez Felipez de Guzmán y Velez, the 3rd Duchess of Medina de las Torres, whose father, Ramiro, had been Viceroy of Naples.

1642 births
1713 deaths
Dukes of Medina Sidonia